Endophysics literally means “physics from within”. It is the study of how the observations are affected and limited by the observer being within the universe. This is in contrast with the common exophysics assumption of a system observed from the “outside”. The term endophysics has been coined by David Finkelstein in a letter to the founder of the field Otto E. Rössler.

See also
 Physics
 Internal measurement (This notion is very similar to endophysics.)

References

 R. J. Boskovich, De spacio et tempore, ut a nobis cognoscuntur, partial English translation in: J. M. Child (Ed.), A Theory of Natural Philosophy, Open Court (1922) and MIT Press, Cambridge, MA, 1966, pp. 203–205.
 T. Toffoli, The role of the observer in uniform systems, in: G. J. Klir (Ed.), Applied General Systems Research, Recent Developments and Trends, Plenum Press, New York, London, 1978, pp. 395–400.
 K. Svozil, Connections between deviations from Lorentz transformation and relativistic energy-momentum relation, Europhysics Letters 2 (1986) 83–85.
 O. E. Rössler, Endophysics, in: J. L. Casti, A. Karlquist (Eds.), Real Brains, Artificial Minds, North-Holland, New York, 1987, p. 25.
 O. E. Rössler, Endophysics. Die Welt des inneren Beobachters, Merwe Verlag, Berlin, 1992, with a foreword by Peter Weibel.
 K. Svozil, Extrinsic-intrinsic concept and complementarity, in: H. Atmanspacker, G. J. Dalenoort (Eds.), Inside versus Outside, Springer-Verlag, Heidelberg, 1994, pp. 273–288.

External links
 Karl Svozil (2005). Computational universes. 
 Interview with O. E. Rössler (in German) Vom Chaos, der Virtuellen Realität und der Endophysik

Philosophy of science